The economy of Palau consists primarily of subsistence agriculture and fishing. The government is the major employer of the work force, relying heavily on financial assistance from the United States. The population enjoys a per capita income of more than twice that of the Philippines and much of Micronesia. Long-term prospects for the tourist sector have been greatly bolstered by the expansion of air travel in the Pacific and the rising prosperity of leading East Asian countries.

Palau's per capita GDP of $17,000 makes it one of the wealthier Pacific Island states. Nominal GDP increased by an annual average of nearly 14% from 1983 to 1990, and by an annual rate of over 10% from 1991 to 1997. Growth turned sharply negative in 1998 and 1999 as a result of the 1997 Asian financial crisis.

Industries
Tourism is Palau's main industry. Activity focuses on scuba diving and snorkeling among the islands' rich marine environment, including the Floating Garden Islands to the west of Koror. Major scuba diving sites include German Channel and Blue Corner. The number of visitors—85% of whom come from Japan, Taiwan, and the U.S.—reached nearly 67,000 in 1997, more than quadruple the level of a decade earlier. Tourism earned $67 million in foreign exchange for Palau in 1996, (which is 1,000 dollars per person) accounting for roughly half of GDP. Arrivals from Asian countries dropped in 1998 and 1999 due to the regional economic downturn and the depreciation of many Asian currencies against the dollar, which made Palau's dollar-denominated prices more expensive.

The service sector dominates the Palauan economy, contributing more than 80% of GDP and employing three-quarters of the work force. The government alone employs nearly 30% of workers. One of the government's main responsibilities is administering external assistance. Under the terms of the Compact of Free Association with the United States, Palau will receive more than $450 million in assistance over 15 years, $30 million per year, and is eligible to participate in more than 40 federal programs. The first grant of $142 million was made in 1994. Further annual payments in lesser amounts will be made through 2009. U.S. grants in 1999 totaled $24 million.

Construction is the most important industrial activity, contributing over 9% of GDP. Several large infrastructure projects, including the rebuilding of the bridge connecting Koror and Babeldaob Islands after its collapse in 1996 and the construction of a highway around the rim of Babeldaob, boosted activity at the end of the 1990s.

Agriculture is mainly on a subsistence level, the principal crops being coconuts, root crops, and bananas. Fishing is a potential source of revenue, but the islands' tuna output dropped by over one-third during the 1990s.

There are no Patent Laws in Palau. Gazetteer – Patents

Economic challenges
The main economic challenge confronting Palau is to ensure the long-term viability of its economy by reducing its reliance on foreign assistance. Palau has created a trust fund to be drawn upon after the cessation of Compact grants, the value of which had grown to $140 million by the beginning of 2009. Also, in the late 1990s, Palau was affected by the 1997 Asian Financial Crisis, and their economy suffered. The island took a huge hit during the COVID-19 pandemic with global travel restrictions putting tourism to a halt. The Asian Development Bank projects that the GDP of Palau contracted by 9.5% in 2020.

Tourism challenges 
In order to tackle mass tourism, the Palau Legacy Project, a sustainable tourism body, created a visa policy for the island of Palau to protect the nation from environmental damage. The "Palau Pledge" was the most awarded campaign of 2018 according to the WARC Creative 100 index.

Economic statistics

Income
Gross Domestic Product (GDP):
purchasing power parity – $132 million (2009 est.)
(GDP estimate includes U.S. subsidy)

GDP – real growth rate:
1% (2009 est.)

GDP – per capita:
purchasing power parity – $8 500 (2009 est.)

GDP – composition by sector
 agriculture: N/A
 industry: N/A
 services: N/A

Population below poverty line:
N/A

Household income or consumption by percentage share
 lowest 10%: N/A
 highest 10%: N/A

Inflation
Inflation rate (consumer prices):
3.4% (2000 est.)

Workforce
Labor force:
10 200 (2000)

Labor force – by occupation
 Agriculture: 20%
 Industry: N/A
 Services: N/A
(1990)

Unemployment rate:
4.2% (2000 est.)

Budget
 Revenues: $57.81 million
 Expenditures: $80.8 million, including capital expenditures of $17.1 million (FY 98/99 est.)

Industries
Dominant industries include tourism, craft items (from shell, wood, pearls), construction, and garment making.

Industrial production growth rate:
N/A

Electricity
Electricity – production:
200 MWh (1996)

Electricity – production by source
 Fossil fuels: 85%
 Hydro: 15%
 Nuclear: 0%
 Other: 0%
(1996)

Electricity – consumption:
200 MWh (1996)

Electricity – exports:
0 kWh (1996)

Electricity – imports:
0 kWh (1996)

Trade
Agriculture – products:
coconuts, copra, cassava (tapioca), sweet potatoes

Exports:
$18 million (f.o.b., 2001)

Exports – commodities:
trochus (type of shellfish), tuna, copra, handicrafts

Exports – partners:
Japan 70.1%, South Korea 15.1% United States 7.1% (2019)

Imports:
$99 million (f.o.b., 2001 est.)

Imports – commodities:
machinery and equipment, fuels, metals, foodstuffs

Imports – partners:
South Korea 18.7%, China 18.2%, Taiwan 16.9%, United States 16.5%, Japan 16%, (2019)

Debt and aid
Debt – external:
$18.4 Billion (2014 estimate). Palau ranks as one of the countries with the highest external debt as a share of GDP.

Economic aid – recipient:
$155.8 million. Note: the Compact of Free Association with the U.S., entered into after the end of the UN trusteeship on 1 October 1994, provides Palau with up to $700 million in U.S. aid over 15 years in return for furnishing military facilities.

Currency
1 United States dollar (US$) = 100 cents

Exchange rates:
U.S. currency is used

Fiscal year
1 October – 30 September

References